This is a list of types of formally designated forests, as institutionalized around the world. It is organized in three sublists: by forest ownership, protection status, and designated use.

By ownership

 Church forests of Ethiopia - protected sacred forests around rural churches
 Community forest
 Community forests in England
 County forest
 Crown land
 Municipal forest

 National forest
 National forest (Brazil) - a type of sustainable use protected area
 The National Forest (England) - a government-supported, "environmental project in central England"
 National forest (France) - a forest that is owned by the French state, originating with the Edict of Moulins of 1566
 National forest (United States) - classification of Federal lands in the United States
 National reserve - legal designation in the United States, beginning in 1978
 Private forest
 Corporate forest
 Private nonindustrial forest land
 Private landowner assistance program - a class of U.S. government assistance program for maintaining, developing, improving and protecting wildlife
 Private reserve
 Private forest reserve
 Private timber reserve (Tasmania)
 Private nature reserve
 Provincial forest - administered or protected by an agency of a province; varies by jurisdiction
 Provincial forests (Manitoba)
 Royal forest - an area of land with varying meanings; not necessarily densely wooded
 State forest - administered or protected by an agency of a state; varies by jurisdiction
 Tribal forest - owned, controlled, and/or utilized by a (formally recognized) indigenous or tribal group

By protection status

 Ancient woodland - formal designation used in the United Kingdom
 Ancient semi-natural woodland (ASNW) - composed of native tree species not obviously planted
 Bannwald - a protected forest area in parts of Germany and Austria
 Biosphere reserve - as designated by UNESCO
 Biological reserve

 Conservation reserve - used in the United States' Conservation Reserve Program
 Forest circle - an administrative area including protected or resource-managed forests, used in India, Pakistan and Bangladesh
 Forest division - a non-overlapping subdivision of a forest circle, used in India, Pakistan and Bangladesh
 Forest park (The Gambia), as in Dobo Forest Park, Faba Forest Park, Finto Manereg Forest Park, etc.
 Forest preserve, formal dedication for state-owned lands within the constitutionally designated Adirondack and Catskill Parks of the U.S. state of New York, required to be kept forever wild.
 Forest protected area - formal designation of the International Union for Conservation of Nature and the World Commission on Protected Areas
 Forest range - a non-overlapping subdivision of a forest division, used in India, Pakistan and Bangladesh
 Forest reserve or preserve
 Recreational forest reserve, e.g. the Recreational Forest Reserve of Fontinhas, Azores
 High-biodiversity wilderness area - an International Union for Conservation of Nature classification

 High conservation value area - developed by the Forest Stewardship Council as a means of defining regions with a specific environmental, socioeconomic, biodiversity or landscape value for use within forestry management certification systems
 High conservation value forest - a FSC designation for forests meeting criteria specified in its "Principles and Criteria of Forest Stewardship"
 Intact forest landscape - NGO-developed term used in forest monitoring
 Old-growth forest - in Australia, formal protection category in the Regional Forest Agreement
 Private natural heritage reserve - designation used in Brazil
 Protected forest - used in Cambodia and India
 Protected landscape - used in the Czech Republic
 Reserve forest - used to designate protected forest areas in British India; used today in Bangladesh, India, Kazakhstan and Pakistan to refer to forests accorded a special degree of protection
 Reserved forests and protected forests of India
 Protected and reserved forests of Pakistan
 Sacred grove - protected in Ghana, Nigeria and possibly elsewhere
 Sacred groves of India

 Schonwald, a type of formally protected forest in Baden-Württemberg, Germany, in which economic usage of the forest is permitted under certain restrictions
 Wild forest, formal designation within the New York Forest Preserve
 Wilderness forest
 Wildlife forest
 Wildlife management area
 Wildlife reserve
 Wildlife sanctuaries of India
 World Heritage Forest - formally recognized for special biophysical or cultural significance; administered by UNESCO

By designated use

 Dehesa - lands utilizing a particular agrosylvopastoral system in Spain and Portugal
 Demonstration forest
 Experimental forest - formal designation used by the United States Forest Service
 Intensive monitoring site - formal designation used by the United States Forest Service
 Long-term ecological research site
 Model forest - formal designation used by the Food and Agriculture Organization and the International Model Forest Network
 Private nonindustrial forest land - small, family owned, and timber-producing forest lands
 Production forest
 Protection forest - forests that mitigate or prevent the impact of a natural hazard; designation in France, Germany, Italy, Switzerland (Schutzwald) and elsewhere in Europe, particularly in mountainous areas (e.g. as a protection against avalanches)
 Research forest
 Research natural area - formal designation used by the United States Forest Service
 Teaching forest

See also 

 Conservation easement
 Forest garden, or food forest
 Forestry law
 Forest reserve (disambiguation)
 Indigenous and Community Conserved Area, IUCN
 Indigenous Protected Area, Australia
 IUCN protected area categories
 Land classifications within the New York Forest Preserve
 National park
 Private protected area
 Protected area
 State park
 Urban forest

References

External links
 UNESCO World Heritage Forest Programme

Forest law
Types of formally
Types of formally designated forests
Forests
 
World forestry